The Embassy of Ireland in Japan is the diplomatic mission of the Republic of Ireland in Japan.

, the current ambassador to Japan is Paul Kavanagh, who had previously served as the Irish Ambassador to the United Arab Emirates, The People’s Republic of China, France and as Permanent Representative to the United Nations in New York.

The embassy is also represented by an Honorary Consul in Sapporo, Hokkaido prefecture.

New building

In 2019, the Department of Foreign Affairs, in conjunction with the Royal Institute of the Architects of Ireland, announced a competition to create the architectural design for a new Irish embassy in Tokyo.

The winning design by the Dublin based architectural firm Henry J Lyons was announced in September 2020.

Construction of the new building is scheduled to begin in March 2023, and is expected to be completed by March 2024. The building will be based in the Yotsuya district of Shinjuku, and is expected to cost a total of €23 million.

Gallery

See also
Foreign relations of Japan
Foreign relations of the Republic of Ireland
List of diplomatic missions of Ireland

References

Ireland
Tokyo
Ireland–Japan relations